Catherine Mason Gordon is an American pediatrician who is Professor of Paediatric Medicine at the Baylor College of Medicine. In 2021 she became the first woman to be the Pediatrician-in-Chief at Texas Children's Hospital.

Early life and education 
Gordon was an undergraduate student at the North Carolina State University, where she studied biochemistry. She moved to the University of North Carolina at Chapel Hill for her medical degree. After graduating with honors, Gordon moved to Boston. She was a medical resident in pediatrics at the Boston Children's Hospital and served as Chief of Adolescent Medicine. After completing her residency, Gordon was appointed a research fellow in adolescent medicine. She was particularly interested in reproductive endocrinology and bone health. She completed two graduate degrees at Harvard Medical School, focusing on public health and clinical investigation.

Research and career 
As an attending physician at the Boston Children's Hospital, Gordon started working on bone loss in women with anorexia nervosa. Patients with anorexia often suffer from weak bones, and Gordon pioneered hormonal treatments to restore bone strength. She founded the hospital's bone health program, making use of peripheral quantitative computed tomography and dual-energy X-ray absorptiometry to establish guidelines for densitometry measurements. In 2018, Gordon joined the Board of NEJM Journal Watch Pediatrics and Adolescent Medicine. She was appointed to the Council of the American Pediatric Society in 2020.

Gordon was appointed Pediatrician-in-Chief at the Texas Children's Hospital and Chair of Pediatric Medicine at the Baylor College of Medicine in 2021. She was the first woman to be elected Pediatrician-in-Chief and, at the time, one of only three women "in-Chiefs" of US News & World Report Honor Roll hospitals. She looked to form partnerships with middle and high schools around Houston and launched a women's health event focused on providing information about puberty, digital safety and vaccines.

During the COVID-19 pandemic, Gordon highlighted the impact of the virus on the mental health of children and adolescents. In particular, she emphasized the need for parents to be aware of the signs of eating disorders in children. Whilst eating disorders primarily impact teenagers, Gordon identified that the disruption in routines and isolation during the pandemic had caused eating disorders in children under the age of ten.

Awards and honors 
 2005 Presidential Early Career Award for Scientists and Engineers
 2008 North Carolina State University Distinguished Engineering Alumnus Award
 2014 Elected member of the American Pediatric Society
 2015 Thomas A. Hazinski Distinguished Service Award
 2019 International Society for Clinical Densitometry Dr. Paul D. Miller Award
 2021 Society for Adolescent Health and Medicine Outstanding Achievement Award
 2021 Osteoporosis International Awards
 2021 Children’s Mercy Kansas Dr. Julius M. and Marjorie R. Kantor Endowed Lectureship

Selected publications

References 

Living people
North Carolina State University alumni
University of North Carolina at Chapel Hill alumni
Harvard Medical School alumni
American pediatricians
Baylor College of Medicine faculty
20th-century American physicians
21st-century American physicians
American women physicians
Year of birth missing (living people)